Courtney Wakefield (born 29 March 1987) is a former Australian rules footballer who last played for the Richmond Football Club in the AFL Women's (AFLW). Wakefield signed with Richmond during the first period of the 2019 expansion club signing period in May. She made her debut against  at Ikon Park in the opening round of the 2020 season. Wakefield won the team's inaugural goalkicking award, after kicking four goals over the six-match season. Wakefield achieved selection in Champion Data's 2021 AFLW All-Star stats team, after leading the league for average tackles inside 50 in the 2021 AFL Women's season, totalling 2.2 a game. In November 2022, Wakefield announced her retirement from football.

Statistics
Statistics are correct to round 3, 2022

|- style="background-color: #eaeaea"
! scope="row" style="text-align:center" | 2020
|style="text-align:center;"|
| 8 || 5 || 4 || 1 || 27 || 5 || 32 || 19 || 13 || 0.8 || 0.2 || 5.4 || 1.0 || 6.4 || 3.8 || 2.6
|- 
| scope="row" style="text-align:center" | 2021
|style="text-align:center;"|
| 8 || 9 || 10 || 6 || 49 || 18 || 67 || 23 || 26 || 1.1 || 0.7 || 5.4 || 2.0 || 7.4 || 2.6 || 2.9
|- style="background:#EAEAEA"
| scope="row" text-align:center | 2022
| 
| 8 || 2 || 2 || 1 || 8 || 5 || 13 || 6 || 8 || 1.0 || 1.0 || 4.0 || 2.5 || 6.5 || 3.0 || 4.0
|-
|- class="sortbottom"
! colspan=3| Career
! 16
! 16
! 8
! 84
! 28
! 112
! 48
! 47
! 1.0
! 0.5
! 5.3
! 1.8
! 7.0
! 3.0
! 2.9
|}

References

External links

 

1987 births
Living people
Richmond Football Club (AFLW) players
Australian rules footballers from Victoria (Australia)